The surf clam (Spisula solida) is a medium-sized marine clam, or bivalve mollusc, found in the Eastern Atlantic from Iceland and northern Norway to Portugal and Spain.
<div align=center>
Right and left valve of the same specimen:

</div align=center>
This species of clam is found in sandy bottom in the sublittoral zone. It is commonly found in the North Sea, Baltic Sea and the Irish Sea.

References

Mactridae
Molluscs described in 1758
Taxa named by Carl Linnaeus